Clifton is a village in the Derbyshire Dales district of Derbyshire, England.  The village is situated about 1.2 miles (2 km) south west of Ashbourne, and is close to the border with Staffordshire. The appropriate civil parish is called Clifton and Compton. The population of this civil parish at the 2011 Census was 500.

History and notable buildings
Margery Bower is a round barrow assumed to date from the Bronze Age.  It lies on the southern side of the village on the road to Snelston.

Clifton Hall was built in the late 18th century, altered in the 19th and 20th centuries.

Holy Trinity church was designed by Henry Isaac Stevens of Derby, and built in 1845.  Opposite the church stands the Cock Inn public house.

The village formerly had a railway station, opened in 1852 as Clifton and renamed in 1893 as Clifton (Mayfield), on a branch of the North Staffordshire Railway between Rocester and Ashbourne.  Passenger services ended in 1954 with the line closing for freight services in 1964.

Local facilities
Education and recreational facilities in and around the village include:
 Clifton Primary School
 Clifton recreation ground
 Clifton Cricket club
 Ashbourne Golf Course

In March 2014, the village was noted in media as the first site for the 'Speedy Shop', an automated retailing solution for small communities designed and manufactured locally. The shop provides a wide range of supplies to the village using a unique automated machine styled like a traditional village store. It was the invention of local entrepreneur Peter Fox and colleague Dave Russell.

Role in Ashbourne shrovetide football
At the site of the old corn mill lies a stone which acts as the Down'ards goal in the annual traditional Royal Shrovetide Football match.  There are two adjacent stone markers, the old and the new.

See also
Listed buildings in Clifton and Compton

Gallery

References

Villages in Derbyshire
Towns and villages of the Peak District
Derbyshire Dales